Tryokhrechye is a rural locality (a selo) in Rodionovsky Selsoviet of Bureysky District, Amur Oblast, Russia. The population was 32 as of 2018.

Geography 
Tryokhrechye is located 45 km north of Novobureysky (the district's administrative centre) by road. Semyonovka is the nearest rural locality.

References 

Rural localities in Bureysky District